Sarah Eckhardt (born 1968) is an American attorney and politician from the state of Texas. She is a member of the Texas Senate and a former county judge for Travis County, Texas.

Early life
Eckhardt is the daughter of Bob Eckhardt, a Democratic politician who represented the Houston area in Congress from 1967 to 1981. Eckhardt attended the High School for the Performing and Visual Arts in Houston. She appeared in the 1981 film Student Bodies. Eckhardt earned a Bachelor of Fine Arts in Theater from New York University in 1986, and joined the Atlantic Theater Company.

Government and political career
Returning to Texas, Eckhardt worked with Ann Richards' 1990 gubernatorial campaign. She was a delegate to the 1992 Democratic National Convention. She became a paralegal in 1993, and enrolled at the University of Texas at Austin in 1994, earning a Master of Public Affairs and Juris Doctor. Eckhardt served as an assistant county attorney for Travis County from 1998 to 2005. Eckhardt was elected to the Travis County Commissioners Court to represent Precinct 2 in the 2006 elections. She was reelected in 2010. In 2013 she resigned her position on the Court in order to be eligible to run to succeed retiring long time County Judge Sam T. Biscoe.  In March, 2014 she defeated Andy Brown in the Democratic primary, and that Fall she was elected Travis County Judge. She was the first woman elected to the serve as Travis County Judge.  In 2018 she was reelected to a second term as County Judge.

In spring 2020, when Kirk Watson announced he would resign from the Texas Senate, Eckhardt announced that she would run in the special election to succeed him, and resigned as county judge in accordance with the Texas Constitution. She received 49.7% of the vote, just shy of the 50% required to avoid a runoff. Eddie Rodriguez, who finished in second with 34% of the vote, decided to forego the runoff, making Eckhardt the winner. Her predecessor, Sam T. Biscoe, served as interim county judge until the swearing in of Andy Brown, who was elected to succeed Eckhardt in November 2020.

On December 4, 2020, Eckhardt was sanctioned by the Texas State Commission on Judicial Conduct (CJC) for remarks that she had made on January 24, 2017, while presiding over a meeting of the Travis County Commissioners Court, and on September 27, 2019, at the Texas Tribune Festival, during a panel discussion, recorded as:

Personal life
Eckhardt married attorney Kurt Sauer in 1998. They have two children, and divorced in 2016.

References

External links
 Profile at the Texas Senate
 Campaign website

Living people
Texas lawyers
County judges in Texas
People from Travis County, Texas
County commissioners in Texas
New York University alumni
University of Texas at Austin alumni
Women state legislators in Texas
21st-century American politicians
21st-century American women politicians
Democratic Party Texas state senators
1968 births